Vernard Isaac Sarsfield (10 December 1905 – 21 January 1984) was an Australian rules footballer who played with Essendon in the Victorian Football League (VFL).

Family
The son of Michael Christopher Sarsfield (1869–1920), and Emily Easter (1870—1939), née O'Sullivan, Vernard Isaac Sarsfield was born at Essendon, Victoria on 10 December 1905.

He married Jean Mary Valentine (1918-2009) on 10 April 1939.

Football
Sarsfield played for Essendon in the first two rounds of the 1929 season before being dropped to the reserves team. In 1936 he moved to Ouyen and played with the Ouyen Rovers club.

Military service
Sarsfield served in the Australian Army during World War II, enlisting under the name "Vernon Sarsfield".

Death
He died at Yarrawonga, Victoria on 21 January 1984.

Notes

References
 Holmesby, Russell & Main, Jim (2014), The Encyclopedia of AFL Footballers: every AFL/VFL player since 1897 (10th ed.), Seaford, Victoria: BAS Publishing. 
 Maplestone, M., Flying Higher: History of the Essendon Football Club 1872–1996, Essendon Football Club, (Melbourne), 1996. 
 World War Two Nominal Roll: Private Vernon Sarsfield (V374490), Department of Veterans' Affairs.
 World War Two Service Record: Private Vernon Sarsfield (V374490), National Archives of Australia.

External links 

		

1905 births
1984 deaths
Australian rules footballers from Melbourne
Essendon Football Club players
People from Essendon, Victoria
Australian Army personnel of World War II
Military personnel from Melbourne